Univere is a village in Mulgi Parish in Viljandi County in southern Estonia. It borders the villages Äriküla, Metsaküla, Leeli, Polli, Karksi-Nuia and Kõvaküla.

References

Villages in Viljandi County